Chucuito is a village in Peru.

Chucuito may also refer to:

Chucuito District, a district in the Puno Province, Peru
Chucuito Province, a province in the Puno Region, Peru